WTJF may refer to:

 WTJF (AM), a radio station (1390 AM) licensed to serve Jackson, Tennessee, United States
 WTJF-FM, a radio station (94.3 FM) licensed to serve Dyer, Tennessee